Count Lars von Engeström (24 December 1751 – 19 August 1826) was a Swedish statesman and diplomat. He served as the first Prime Minister for Foreign Affairs from 1809 to 1824, and as the Chancellor of Lund University from 1810 to 1824.

He served as envoy in Vienna from 1782 to 1787, Warsaw from 1788 to 1792, London from 1793 to 1795, and ambassador in Vienna from 1795.

He was elected a member of the Royal Swedish Academy of Sciences in 1810.

References and notes

External links 
Lars von Engeström - Svenskt biografiskt handlexikon (in Swedish)

1751 births
1826 deaths
Members of the Royal Swedish Academy of Sciences
18th-century Swedish nobility
19th-century Swedish politicians
Ambassadors of Sweden to Austria
Ambassadors of Sweden to Poland
Ambassadors of Sweden to the United Kingdom
Gustavian era people
Knights of the Order of Charles XIII